Walter Brocton "Bill" Kay (February 14, 1878 – December 3, 1945) was an outfielder in Major League Baseball. Nicknamed "King Bill", he played for the Washington Senators in 1907.

References

External links

1878 births
1945 deaths
Major League Baseball outfielders
Washington Senators (1901–1960) players
Baseball players from Virginia
Minneapolis Millers (baseball) players
Albany Senators players
Montgomery Billikens players
Newark Indians players
Binghamton Bingoes players
Springfield Ponies players
Greenville Spinners players
Binghamton Triplets players
Wilkes-Barre Barons (baseball) players
Columbia Comers players
People from Craig County, Virginia